The Graduate School (also known as TGS) is the liberal arts and sciences graduate school of Northwestern University. Based in Evanston, Illinois, The Graduate School also has campuses in Chicago and Doha, Qatar and awards advanced degrees in 70 disciplines.

In 1910, the Trustees of the university organized The Graduate School. TGS makes up one of Northwestern University's 10 Graduate and Professional schools. As such, professional degrees are not conferred by The Graduate School, but by their respective schools at Northwestern: Feinberg School of Medicine, Kellogg School of Management, Medill School of Journalism, McCormick School of Engineering and Applied Sciences, School of Communication, School of Education and Social Policy, Pritzker School of Law, Henry and Leigh Bienen School of Music, and School of Professional Studies.

TGS is Northwestern's largest graduate school with 3569 full-time students and 238 part-time students, as of 2014.

History 
Prior to the founding of The Graduate School, the graduate program was loosely structured and under the supervision by a committee of the Faculty of the College of Liberal Arts, which had existed since the 1890s. Upon the recommendation of Abram Winegardner Harris, the fourteenth President of the university, the Trustees of the university voted to establish the school in 1910. James Alton James, a member of the history department, became the first graduate school dean in 1917.

The Graduate School saw an increasing number of applicants in the decade after its founding. With the exception of the years of 1917-18 and 1918–19, where many college students were enlisted in the army during WW1, attendance increased every year between 1910 and 1922: from 91 students in 1910–11 to 300 in 1922. The post-WW1 years in particular saw a growing focus, in American universities, on graduate studies and research, in part due to the increase in attendance. This in turn saw increased competition for graduate students. Recognizing this as well as The Graduate School's shortcomings, Dean James Alton James, in a plea to the University President Scott, stressed the need for additional financial support for The Graduate School to enable it to expand its offerings, as well as the need for a library and housing for graduate students. His requests were met with limited success, but included the first grant for faculty research: $1000 awarded by the Northwestern University Foundation.

In a 1935-36 report, Franklyn Bliss Snyder, the third Dean of TGS and later President of the university, questioned the quality of education provided by The Graduate School and whether it met the standards expected of graduate instruction. He proposed a number of policy changes, including a rigorous entrance examination. Snyder's proposals motivated the creation of programs of study for prospective teachers that would improve teaching standards.

Since 1936, The Graduate School has seen steadily increasing enrollment as well as a wider range of program offerings. Opening fall enrollments have increased by 43% between 1995 and 2014, from 2502 to 3569.

Leadership and Organization 
Despite its marked affiliations with the Northwestern schools whose programs it administers, The Graduate School on an administrative level is a separate entity with its own leadership and organizational structure. The chief administrative position is held by the Dean of The Graduate School, who functions as an advisor to his staff and students as well as a liaison and representative working to facilitate cross-school coordination. Currently, this title is assumed by race and literary scholar Dwight A. McBride, who also serves as the Associate Provost for Graduate Education.

The school's decanal staff oversees the 5 main branches of The Graduate School's administrative body, which are listed below:
 Administration and Planning: Led by its Associate Dean, this branch oversees the logistical functions of the organization, of which include: Administration and Finance, Financial Aid, Information Technology, Research and Analysis and English Language Programs.
 Academic Affairs: Led by its Associate Dean, this branch oversees the development of the school's programs, curricula, academic policies, and admissions.
 Student Affairs: Led by its Associate Dean, this branch oversees several offices, of which include Academic Student Services, Student Life, Graduate and Postdoctoral Training and Development, Training Grant Support Office, Professional Development, and Postdoctoral Affairs.
 Diversity and Inclusion: Led by its Assistant Dean, this branch works closely with other departments to facilitate diverse recruitment, mentorship programs, and a support system for underrepresented student populations.
 Communications and Outreach: Led by its associate director, this branch works to create and maintain all of the school's messaging, branding, social media, event coordination, and outreach.
Alongside the main administrative body, the Dean also communicates with a separate Administrative Board. Composed of 12 graduate faculty members representing all of the associated schools and the library, the Board functions as an advisory body for all academic and faculty-related affairs. In addition, the Office of the Dean also receives reviews and propositions from three faculty-led advisory councils tackling Academic Affairs, Student Affairs, and Graduate Funding.

Academics & Degree programs 
In addition to doctoral and master's degree programs in more than 70 disciplines, TGS also offers numbers of dual degree programs, interdisciplinary clusters and certificates and non-degree seeking programs.

Broadly speaking, TGS's focus is PhD, MFA and non-terminal master's degree programs. TGS offers Master of Fine Arts in Art Theory and Practice, Documentary Media, Theater Directing & Stage Design) and Writing for the Screen and Stage. Some departments in TGS do not offer terminal master's degree which means graduate students receive the master's degree after their pursuit of the PhD degree. Departments that offer only PhD degrees may also offer a master's degree only to PhD students, either on the way to earning their PhD degrees or in the event the student needs to depart the university before completing the PhD.

Some specialized master's degree programs and professional degrees are not conferred by TGS, but by respective professional schools at NU: Feinberg School of Medicine, Kellogg School of Management, McCormick School of Engineering and Applied Science, Medill School of Journalism, Media, Integrated Marketing Communications, School of Communication, School of Law and School of Education & Social Policy. Decisions on whether a master's degree resides within TGS or another school at Northwestern are made in consultation with the respective schools.

Dual Degree Programs 
The Graduate School offers combined dual degree programs with bachelor's programs in two of the Northwestern undergraduate schools: McCormick School of Engineering & Weinberg College of Arts and Sciences. Participating students are restricted to Northwestern undergraduates. Students may choose to start the pursuit of master's degree when they have less than four courses to complete their undergraduate bachelor's degree or they may start the pursuit of the master's degree after they graduated from their undergraduate school.

Programs with partner institutions require admission to and residency at each institution and completion of each institution's degree requirements

Interdisciplinary Clusters and Certificates 
In addition to their degree programs, participating graduate students make connections with faculty members and other students outside their departments. Interdisciplinary research opportunities of joint interests are provided. The combination of degree courses, co-curricular and extra-curricular events arouses students’ thoughts and broadens their interdisciplinary networks with researchers and other colleagues.

Apart from different completion requirements, the main difference between a cluster and a certificate is that a cluster will not be presented on student's’ official transcript but a certificate will.

Non-degree Status 
Non-degree seeking students can take graduate-level classes at TGS through two means: apply through the Graduate School or through School of Professional Studies. After TGS granted students the "Nondegree Special Student status", students would be allowed to enroll for classes at TGS but not pursue a degree.

Graduate Funding 
Fellowships provide graduate students with scholarship or stipend resources to pay for their tuition costs, based on merit. There are three available fellowships and grants opportunities for students: internal fellowship] and grant] administered by TGS and external fellowship] administered by outside sources. To be eligible for consideration of any forms of financial aid, graduate students must show good academic progress toward meeting their degree requirements.

Notable alumni

Alumni of The Graduate School are prominent across many disciplines, including academia, the arts, entertainment, business, science, journalism, politics, and government.

Academia 
From K.T. Chau, Chair Professor of Geotechnical Engineering at The Hong Kong Polytechnic University, to Deborah Paredez, Professor of Theatre and Dance at the University of Texas at Austin, TGS alumni are professors at universities across the globe and across many fields of study. Alumni who are professors at universities worldwide include Amy Allen, Elijah Anderson, James Hal Cone, William C. Dudley, Troy Duster, Kathryn Edin, Simon Gikandi, Avner Greif, Cynthia Herrup, Rosanna Hertz, John B. Hogenesch, Michael J. Hopkins, Jonathan D. Katz, Nirmalya Kumar, George Nemhauser, Scott E. Page, Charles M. Payne, Ralph Pearson, Jack Nusan Porter, Adam Przeworski, Mark Ratner David R. Roediger, Said Sheikh Samatar, Grover C. Stephens, and Glen L. Urban. TGS alumni have also continued to serve as Presidents and Chancellors of colleges and universities. Johnnetta B. Cole, the first Black woman to serve as the president of Spelman College, also is the former President of Bennett College. John B. Simpson was the 14th President of the University at Buffalo; J. Dennis O'Connor is a former chancellor at the University of Pittsburgh; Frank E. Horton is a former chancellor at University of Wisconsin-Milwaukee, University of Oklahoma, and University of Toledo; David J. Skorton was a president at Cornell University; and Graham Spanier was a president at Pennsylvania State University. Susan Fuhrman is currently serving as the first female president of Teacher's College at Columbia University.

Arts, Literature, and Entertainment 
Significant figures in the arts, literature, and entertainment are also alumni of The Graduate School. TGS produced directors like Tony Award winner and writer Mary Zimmerman, director and stage actress Jeanne Clemson, and Gerald Freedman. Actor Richard Kline, David Horowitz from Fight Back! With David Horowitz, and co-host of What Not To Wear Clinton Kelly are all graduates of TGS. Writers in this field, like poet Mary Jo Bang, author and MacArthur Fellow Aleksandar Hemon, composer and bandmaster Thomas Tyra, and Emmy-nominated screenwriter Lew Hunter are also alumni.

Business 
In business, one can see many figures who are graduates of TGS. These include Lisa Caputo, chairman and CEO of Citigroup Women and Company, Sheraton Kalouria, CMO and Executive Vice President of Sony Pictures Television, and Gwynne Shotwell, President and COO of SpaceX. For notable M.B.A. alumni, also see the Kellogg School of Management.

Science 
TGS has also graduated distinguished scientists. 1998 Nobel Prize winner in Physiology/Medicine Robert F. Furchgott, forensic anthropologist and former Chief Medical Examiner of North Carolina Kathy Reichs, sociologist and historian Sonya Rose, and physician and writer George W. Crane all received degrees from The Graduate School. Astronomer and UFO researcher Jacques Vallee and the director of Goddard Space Flight Center Edward Weiler also attended TGS. Kermit E Krantz, who was a developer of surgical techniques and invented the expandable tampon, is also a TGS alum.

Journalism 
Prominent names in journalism also have received degrees from TGS. Author and columnist Kai Bird and New York Times reporter James Risen are both TGS alums who have won a Pulitzer Prize. USA Today sports columnist Christine Brennan, LA Times columnist and writer Patrick Goldstein, and Louisiana journalist Jack Wardlaw are also alumni. Two reporters at the New York Times, Peter Applebome and Benedict Carey, attended TGS as well.

International 
Michael Bakalis, former Deputy Secretary of Education in US Department of Education and Armida Alisjahbana, State Minister of National Development Planning, Head of National Development Planning Agency (BAPPENAS), Republic of Indonesia also earned degrees from The Graduate School.

References

External links 
 Official Site
 List of disciplines

Graduate School
Graduate schools in the United States
Educational institutions established in 1910
1910 establishments in Illinois